The Louvet River is a river of Saint Lucia. It drains from the forest area to the east coast.

See also
List of rivers of Saint Lucia

References

Integrating the Management of Watersheds and Coastal Areas in St. Lucia

Rivers of Saint Lucia